Adrien Charles Deshommets de Martainville (May 5, 1783 – October 17, 1847) was a French politician.

Biography 

Adrien de Martainville was born in Rouen, on Monday May 5, 1783. He was the son of Charles Gabriel Deshommets, marquis de Martainville, Colonel of the cavalry (1740-1800), and Françoise Louise Bigot de Sommesnil (1757-1811). In 1813, he became a member of the Administrative Committee of the Hospitals of Rouen. Successful in this business, he was entrusted with the establishment of an annex of hospices in the church of Saint-Yon, helping typhus patients. In 1815, he married Marie Belhomme de Glatigny (1780-1853)

In 1816, he was a member of the General Council of Lower Seine. He was appointed mayor of Rouen on June 20, 1821, when he succeeds Charles Louis Élie Lefebvre. He holds this office until the Revolution of 1830. During his tenure as mayor of Rouen, are built the stone bridge, the monumental cemetery and St. Paul's Church. He was also at the origin of the enlargement of the Hôtel de Ville, the construction of the new Exchange and the Boeildieu Course, the extension of the Rue Royale (now Republic Street) and the creation of charity workshops.

In 1821, he was one of the founders of the savings bank of Rouen. He attended the laying of the first stone of St. Yon asylum on Sunday August 25, 1822.

From February 25, 1824, to November 5, 1827, he was a member of the parliament, representing the Yvetot borough. He sat in the government majority. He was president of the General Council of Lower Seine from 1825 to 1831. In 1830, Martainville was replaced as mayor of Rouen by Henry Barbet. He died in his castle of Sassetot-le-Mauconduit, on Sunday October 17, 1847.

Distinctions 

Adrien de Martainville was elected as member of the [Central Agricultural Society of Lower Sein] in 1820 and as resident member of the Academy of Sciences, Literature and Fine Arts of Rouen in 1820. He was appointed Knight of the Legion of Honor in 1821. Martainville was also peer of France and gentleman of the King's Chamber.<ref name=R2>[http://gw13.geneanet.org/garric?lang=fr;p=adrien+charles;n=deshommets+de+martainville Adrien Charles DESHOMMETS DE MARTAINVILLE - Essai de].</ref>

 Family 

Adrien de Martainville had a sister, Marie Françoise Gabrielle Emilie de Mauduit de Sémerville (1780-1805). His only son, François Charles Esmeri Deshommets de Martainville, had no heirs.

 Bibliography 

 1826 – Rapport au nom de la commission chargée de l'examen du projet de loi relatif à l'affectation à divers départements....

 References 

 .*.
 Charles de Beaurepaire, Inventaire-sommaire des archives départementales antérieures à 1790, Seine-Inférieure: Archives civiles, série C, Imprimerie et Librarie Administratives de Paul Dupont, 1903.
 Charles de Beaurepaire, Inventaire sommaire des Archives départementales antérieures à 1790, Seine-Inférieure: Archives civiles, Série C (Nos. 2215-2969)-Série D, Lecerf Fils, 1903, vol. 2.
 Georges H. Faucon, La juridiction consulaire de Rouen, 1556-1905: d'après les documents authentiques et avec l'agrément du Tribunal de Commerce de Rouen, Hérissey, 1905.
 Précis Analytique des Travaux de l'Académie des Sciences, Belles-lettres et Arts de Rouen, ed. Académie des Sciences, January 27, 2009. 
  Henry Decaëns, Histoire de Rouen'', 2003, ed. Jean-Paul Gisserot, coll. Gisserot – Histoire, .

1783 births
1847 deaths
Politicians from Rouen
French nobility
Legitimists
Members of the Chamber of Deputies of the Bourbon Restoration